Łagiewniki-Borek Fałęcki is one of 18 districts of Kraków, located in the southern part of the city. The name Łagiewniki-Borek Fałęcki comes from two villages that are now parts of the district. 

Subdivisions of Łagiewniki-Borek Fałęcki 
Łagiewniki-Borek Fałęcki is divided into smaller subdivisions (osiedles). Here's a list of them.
 Borek Fałęcki
 Łagiewniki
 Osiedle Cegielniana
 Osiedle Zaułek Jugowicki

Population

References

External links
 Official website of Łagiewniki-Borek Fałęcki
 Biuletyn Informacji Publicznej

Districts of Kraków